Thanks is an American television sitcom that debuted on CBS on August 2, 1999, and ran for six episodes from 8:30 to 9:00pm ET on Monday nights until September 6, 1999. The program explores the trials and tribulations of the Winthrops, a  17th-century Puritan family, in Plymouth, Massachusetts.  Characters take their names from John Winthrop, the famed governor of the original Bostonian Puritan community, and John Cotton, another prominent Puritan religious leader.

Cast
In alphabetical order:
Amy Centner as Elizabeth Winthrop
Erika Christensen as Abigail Winthrop
Andrew Ducote as William Winthrop
Tim Dutton as James Winthrop
Cloris Leachman as Grammy Winthrop
Robert Machray as Magistrate
Kirsten Nelson as Polly Winthrop
Jim Rash as John Cotton

Episodes

External links
 
 Sarah Vowell essay on Thanks at Salon.com, published on August 25, 1999.
 Sarah Vowell additional commentary on This American Life from WBEZ Chicago on Chicago Public Radio distributed by Public Radio International (PRI): Episode 328 – What I Learned From TV, originally aired on March 16, 2007.

Television series by ABC Studios
Television series set in the 17th century
Television series about the history of the United States
CBS original programming
1990s American sitcoms
Television shows set in Massachusetts
1999 American television series debuts
1999 American television series endings
English-language television shows